The Dark Page is a 1944 novel by Samuel Fuller, who later went on to become a film director and helm the likes of I Shot Jesse James and the film noir The Naked Kiss. 

It was written while Fuller was an infantryman in the army in WWII and was filmed as Scandal Sheet (1952).

References

1944 American novels
American novels adapted into films
Duell, Sloan and Pearce books